The 2014 NBL Canada Draft was held on August 24, 2014, at the Athlete Institute in Orangeville, Ontario. A total of 24 players were selected in three rounds. Jordan Weidner was selected by the Mississauga Power with the first overall pick.

Draft

References

National Basketball League of Canada Draft
Draft
NBL Canada draft
NBL Canada draft
Basketball in Ontario
Events in Ontario
Dufferin County